Earl is an unincorporated community in Callaway County, in the U.S. state of Missouri.

History
A post office called Earl was established in 1891, and remained in operation until 1907. The community was named after Earl Sexton, the son of a local merchant.

References

Unincorporated communities in Callaway County, Missouri
Unincorporated communities in Missouri
Jefferson City metropolitan area